The Buenos Aires Provincial Police (Spanish: Policía de la Provincia de Buenos Aires, informally Policía Bonaerense) is the police service responsible for policing the Province of Buenos Aires, in Argentina.

It is one of the biggest police services of Argentina, responsible for policing a province of over 15 million inhabitants, about 38% of Argentina's entire population. The Federal Capital district of Buenos Aires city is under the separate jurisdiction of the Buenos Aires City Police.

The institution is usually referred to as Policía Bonaerense, where bonaerense is the demonym for the Province of Buenos Aires. This contrasts with porteño, used for the inhabitants of the Buenos Aires city.

This police force is subordinate to the Provincial Ministry of Security headed by Minister Sergio Berni. The Chief of the force is Daniel Alberto García, after Fabian Perroni quit the police force in November 2019.

Police Ranks

Until January 2005, the Buenos Aires Police used the same rank system as employed by the Federal Police and other Argentine provincial police forces. This system consisted of seventeen ranks, of which nine were for (commissioned) officers and eight were for sub-officers (including the basic rank of agent). A new and simplified rank system was established through passage of a law governing police personnel.

This system officially abolished the distinction between (commissioned) officers and sub-officers. It instituted a rank system consisting of the following nine ranks, listed in descending order:

Current rank system
As of 2009, a new law modified the police ranks and established some variations (Ley 13.982/09). It establishes different personnel rankings ("Escalafones" as they are called in Spanish), which relate to operational responsibilities:

 Officers of the General ranking;
 Officers of the Command ranking;
 Professional Officers;
 Administrative Officers;
 Technical Officers;
 General Services personnel;
 911 personnel;
 Civilian personnel.

The current levels for the Command sub-ranking are (ten levels) in descending order:
 1) Conducting Officers:
Comisario General
Comisario Mayor
 2) Supervision Officers:
Comisario Inspector
 3) Chief Officers:
Comisario
Subcomisario
 4) Subordinate Officers:
Oficial Principal
Oficial Inspector
Oficial Subinspector
Oficial Ayudante
Oficial Subayudante
The General sub-ranking defines seven levels (the general sub-ranking is subordinate to the commando sub-ranking, so its highest ranking is subordinate to the lowest ranking of commando officers):
 1) Superior Officers:
Mayor (Major)
Capitán (Captain)
Teniente 1ro. (First Lieutenant)
 2) Subordinate Officers:
Teniente (Lieutenant)
Subteniente (Sublieutenant)
Sargento (Sergeant)
Oficial (Officer)
 3) Police Academy cadet.
Both the Commando and General rankings represent the sworn officers (armed personnel). The other rankings constitute the support staff. For the Professional, Technical and Administrative sub-rankings, the levels of the Commando sub-ranking is employed. The subordinate relationship between the subrankings makes the Commando ranking the highest group over all.

Equipment

Arms 

 Bersa Thunder 9
 Ithaca 37
 Hatsan Escort AimGuard
 Mossberg 500
 FMK-3
 IMI Uzi
 FN FAL
 Remington 700

Vehicles 
 Toyota Hilux
 Renault Duster Oroch
 Chevrolet Astra
 Ford Ranger
 Ford Focus
 Toyota Etios
 Volkswagen Voyage
 Fiat Siena
 Iveco Daily
 Ram 1500

Helicópters 
 MBB Bo 105
 Eurocopter AS350 Ecureuil

See also

Argentine Federal Police
Buenos Aires Police Intelligence
Buenos Aires Urban Guard
Santa Fe Province Police
Interior Security System

References

External links
 
Police website
Ministry of Security website

Provincial law enforcement agencies of Argentina